Miguelanxo Prado is a Galician comic book creator.  He was born in A Coruña, Spain in 1958.

Biography

Prado studied architecture, wrote novels and painted before his career in comics.

He worked for several magazines and wrote delirious and fierce life-chronicles.  He published his first albums at Les Humanoïdes Associés: Chienne de Vie (1988), C'est du Sport (1989) and Y'a Plus de Justice (1991).

His best-known comic book is Trazo de Tiza or Trait de craie (Streak of Chalk, 1992). This is a dream-like, experimental "impossible" story about a man on an island, unable to distinguish dream from reality, or present from past. For this album, Prado won several awards, among others the Alph'Art for the Best Foreign Album at the Angoulême International Comics Festival, receiving this award for the second time; the first time was in 1991 for Manuel Montano. In April 2007 he was awarded the Grand Prize at the Salón del Cómic of Barcelona.

animation
Prado did character design for the animated Men In Black: The Series in the late '90s.  His animated feature film,  was released in 2007.

Bibliography 
Chienne de vie, 1988, absurd chronicles of the day-to-day life
Demain les dauphins, 1988,  
Manuel Montano, 1989, 
C'est du sport, 1989, absurd chronicles of the day-to-day life
Stratos, 1990
Y a plus de justice, 1990
Trait de craie, 1993,  
Pierre et le loup (Peter And the Wolf), 1995, adaptation of Prokofievs story,  
Chroniques absurdes, Tome 1 : Un monde délirant ("Quotidien délirant"), 1996, absurd chronicles of the day-to-day life, 
Chroniques absurdes, Tome 2 : Un monde de brutes, 
Chroniques absurdes, Tome 3 : Un monde barbare, 
Venins de femmes (Tangents), 
 The Sandman: Endless Nights -Dream: The Heart of a Star Neil Gaiman, 2003  
Nostalgies de Belo Horizonte quand j'étais un autre,  2005, 
 Papeles dispersos (2009)  (Norma Editorial)
 Ardalén (2012)  (Norma Editorial)
 Papeles dispersos II (2015)   (Norma Editorial)
 Presas fáciles (2016)  (Norma Editorial)
 El pacto del Letargo (2020) Norma

Awards
 1991: Best Foreign Comic Book at the Angoulême International Comics Festival, France
 1994: Best Foreign Comic Book at the Angoulême International Comics Festival
 1998: Best German-language Comic for Children and Young People at the Max & Moritz Prizes, Germany
 2004: Eisner Award for Best Anthology, U.S.
 2007: Grand Prize, Salón del Comic, Barcelona, Spain

Sources

 
 Prado profile, Readyourselfraw.com
 Miguelanxo Prado albums,  Bedetheque.com 
 Prado publications dans (A SUIVRE), Bdoubliees.com

Footnotes

External links
 Miguelanxo Prado biography on Lambiek Comiclopedia
 Miguelanxo Prado biography on Guia del Comic 
 Miguelanxo Prado biography on Casterman 
 Khoury, George. The World of Miguelanxo Prado, Pop!, Comic Book Resources, April 26, 2009

1958 births
Living people
Spanish comics artists
Spanish comics writers
20th-century Spanish artists
People from A Coruña